Kostas Ouranis (1890–1953) was an acclaimed Greek poet, travel writer and journalist.

Life
Ouranis was born in Constantinople in 1890 to Nikolaos Niarchos and Angeliki Yannousi from Leonidio, Arcadia, where he grew up and went to elementary school. He went to high school in Nafplion and then Constantinople, where he graduated. In 1908 he moved to Athens and worked as a journalist for a while, before moving to Paris for studies he did not complete.

While there, he suffered from tuberculosis, and relocated to Davos in Switzerland in order to recover. There he met Manuela Santiago from Portugal, they got married but the marriage did not last. His second marriage, which lasted until his death in 1953 was with Eleni Ourani, also known with the pen name Alkis Thrylos (Άλκης Θρύλος).

He was the Greek Consul in Lisbon from 1920 to 1924, when he moved back to Athens and worked as a journalist in many newspapers; as a correspondent he traveled throughout the world. His shaky health, however, deteriorated, especially during the Occupation of Greece (1941–1945). He died from a heart attack in 1953.

Legacy
To this day, the Ouranis foundation, run by the Academy of Athens, grants scholarships to foreign students studying Modern Greek Literature, gives each year awards for prose, poetry and essay and publishes works of Greek Literature under the series Νεοελληνική Βιβλιοθήκη (Modern Greek Library).

Selected works

The main part of his works were poetry and travel writing; he also wrote essays and he was a distinguished translator. Many of his works was collected and published posthumously by his widow, Eleni Ourani.

Poems
Σαν όνειρα (Like dreams), 1909
Spleen, 1912
Νοσταλγίες (Nostalgies), 1920
Ποιήματα (Poems), 1953

Travel writing
Sol y Sombra (Sun and shadow), 1934
Σινά, το Θεοβάδιστον Όρος (Sinai, the mountain walked by God), 1944
Ιταλία (Italy), 1953
Ισπανία (Spain), 1954
Γλαυκοί δρόμοι (Glaucous Roads), 1955
Ελλάδα (Greece), 1956
Από τον Ατλαντικό στη Μαύρη Θάλασσα (From the Atlantic to the Black Sea), 1957

Other works
Κάρολος Μπωντλαίρ (Charles Baudelaire), 1918
Αναβίωση (Rebirth), 1955
Αποχρώσεις (Tones of Color), 1956
Δικοί μας και ξένοι (Our own and foreign), 1954-1956 (in three volumes)
Στιγμιότυπα (Short Cuts), 1958

Notes

External links
Official website for the Kostas and Eleni Ouranis foundation
A bio and some poems (1)
A bio and some poems (2)
A bio and some poems (3)
Poems which were set to music

1890 births
1953 deaths
Greek male poets
Constantinopolitan Greeks
Greeks from the Ottoman Empire
Emigrants from the Ottoman Empire to Greece
20th-century Greek poets
20th-century Greek male writers
People from Nafplion
Writers from Istanbul
Journalists from Istanbul